Israël Chaim "Ischa" Meijer (14 February 1943 – 14 February 1995) was a Dutch journalist, television presenter, radio presenter, critic and author. He survived the Nazi concentration camp Bergen Belsen along with his parents.

Youth
Ischa Meijer was born as the oldest child of historian Jaap Meijer and Liesbeth Voet. He was deported to the Bergen-Belsen concentration camp as a baby along with his parents. They managed to survive, and returned to Amsterdam after the war, where Ischa's siblings Mirjam and Job were born. The family emigrated to Paramaribo in Surinam in the 1950s, fearing a communist take-over. After a few years the Meijer family returned to Amsterdam after having difficulties adjusting to the environment. Ischa grew up in a family traumatised by the experiences of the Holocaust which led to emotional as well as alleged physical abuse by his parents. He was thrown out of the house at age eighteen. His parents also ended contact with Ischa's siblings.

Career

He became well known for his extensive and disclosing interviews. In 1984 he published a controversial interview with politician (and at that time mayor of Rotterdam) Bram Peper, which caused a lot of commotion throughout the country. The interview eventually was one of the reasons for Peper to divorce his wife, and start a period of heavy alcoholism.

Radio and television
For a considerable time Meijer was the host of the radio show Een Uur Ischa (One Hour Ischa), later transformed into Een Dik Uur Ischa (lit. An extended Hour Ischa). He also hosted a late-night show on the television network RTL 5.

Relationships
Meijer had several relationships throughout his life, and also visited prostitutes on a regular basis, giving him the inspiration to write the book Hoeren (Hookers) (1980). In the late 1980s Meijer had a relationship with comedian and actress Jenny Arean. In the years preceding his death he had a solid relationship with writer Connie Palmen, who wrote a book about her relationship with Ischa, called I.M. (1998).

Death and legacy
Ischa continued throughout his life searching for the love his parents never gave to him. When Ischa's mother became seriously ill in 1993, Ischa and his siblings were not allowed to say goodbye. Several weeks after her death Ischa's father Jaap died as well.

On 14 February 1995, on his 52nd birthday, Ischa Meijer died of a heart attack while on his way to his coffeehouse to celebrate his birthday. He left behind a son, Jeroen, and a daughter, Jessica. Dutch news media gave much attention to his death.

Besides the book I.M. another book was launched concerning the life of Meijer, this time by his sister Mirjam who wrote the book Mijn broer Ischa (My brother Ischa) (1997). Meijer also played a background role in another book by Connie Palmen, Geheel de Uwe (Entirely Yours).

A documentary on Meijer's life was broadcast on Dutch television on 14 February 2005 called Ik hou van mij (I love myself), made by documentary maker Kees de Groot van Embden.

Filmography

External links
 Biography Ischa Meijer 
  Ischa Meijer's work 

1943 births
1995 deaths
Dutch investigative journalists
Dutch opinion journalists
Dutch columnists
Dutch commentators
Dutch comics writers
Dutch political writers
Dutch television talk show hosts
Dutch television critics
Dutch political journalists
Dutch radio presenters
Dutch autobiographers
Dutch critics
Dutch male short story writers
Dutch relationships and sexuality writers
Dutch expatriates in Suriname
Male screenwriters
Dutch male dramatists and playwrights
Jewish Dutch writers
Jewish dramatists and playwrights
Jewish male actors
Bergen-Belsen concentration camp survivors
Writers from Amsterdam
Male actors from Amsterdam
20th-century Dutch dramatists and playwrights
20th-century Dutch male actors
20th-century Dutch short story writers
20th-century Dutch male writers
20th-century screenwriters